147 may refer to:

 147 (number), a natural number
 AD 147, a year of the Julian calendar, in the second century
 147 BC, a year of the pre-Julian Roman calendar
 147 AH, a year in the Islamic calendar that corresponds to 764 – 765 CE

In the military
 BQM-147 Dragon unmanned aerial vehicle, a tactical battlefield UAV operated by the US Marine Corps
 Ryan Model 147 Lightning Bug was a drone, or unmanned aerial vehicle during the 1960s
  was a United States Navy Admirable-class minesweeper during World War II
  was a United States Navy Edsall-class destroyer escort during World War II
  was a United States Navy Haskell-class attack transport during World War II
  was a United States Navy General G. O. Squier-class transport ship during World War II
  was a United States Navy Wickes-class destroyer during World War II
  was a United States Navy Neosho-class fleet oiler of the United States Navy during the Six-Day War

Science and medicine
 147 Protogeneia, a large main belt asteroid with a low eccentricity and low inclination
 NGC 147, a Dwarf spheroidal galaxy about 2.58 million light-years away in the constellation Cassiopeia
 Promethium-147, an isotope of promethium with a half-life of 2.62 years
 JWH-147 is an analgesic drug used in scientific research, which acts as a cannabinoid agonist at both the CB1 and CB2 receptors

In snooker
 The maximum break, the highest possible break in snooker, in the absence of fouls and refereeing errors
 147-Break is a 1983 documentary with Steve Davis, an English professional snooker player
 The Snooker 147 PlayStation 2 game

In transportation
 147th Street (Sibley Boulevard) station, Metra Electric station in Harvey, Illinois, United States
 The Alfa Romeo 147 car, produced since 2000
 The Fiat 147 was a three-door hatchback compact car produced in Brazil from 1976 until 1986
 The Volkswagen Type 147 Kleinlieferwagen, produced from 1964 to 1974

Other uses
 Sonnet 147, a work by Shakespeare

See also
 List of highways numbered 147
 
 United Nations Security Council Resolution 147
 United States Supreme Court cases, Volume 147
 Psalm 147